Leif Carlsen was Danish football forward. During his career he played for Boldklubben Frem, Hvidovre IF, and Landskrona BoIS.

Carlsen was born in 1943 in Denmark, and died in 2018.

Career 
Carlsen played for the Danish football club Boldklubben Frem in the Danish Superliga from 1964 to 1966.

During the 1967 and 1968 seasons, he represented Hvidovre IF, where he scored six goals. One of them was in the Danish Cup final, where Carlsen scored the second goal in a 2-0 victory against Esbjerg fB.

In 1970 he transferred to the Swedish team Landskrona BoIS. In August 1970, Leif Carlsen famously scored the only goal in the league's division promotion qualifiers. After further success, the team was promoted to the Swedish league Allsvenskan. At the time, however, non-Swedish citizens were not allowed to play in the top Swedish league and Leif Carlsen could no longer play with Landskrona BoIS in 1971.

References

1943 births
2018 deaths
Danish men's footballers
Landskrona BoIS players
Place of birth missing
Association footballers not categorized by position